The Sound of One Hand Clapping is a 1998 Australian drama film directed by Richard Flanagan, based on the 1997 novel of the same name. It was entered into the 48th Berlin International Film Festival. The film was shot in Hobart, Tasmania.

At the ARIA Music Awards of 1998 the soundtrack was nominated for Best Original Soundtrack, Cast or Show Album.

Cast
 Kerry Fox as Sonja Buloh
 Kristof Kaczmarek as Bojan Buloh
 Rosie Flanagan as Sonja, age 8
 Arabella Wain as Sonja, age 3
 Evelyn Krape as Jenja
 Melita Jurisic as Maria Buloh
 Jacek Koman as Picotti
 Essie Davis as Jean
 Regina Gaigalas as Mrs. Michnik (as Gina Gaigalas)
 Julie Forsyth as Mrs. Heaney

Production
Richard Flanagan originally wrote the story as a screenplay but was unable to get it financed. He then adapted it into a novel. This attracted interest from financiers and Flanagan asked Rolf de Heer to direct; de Heer did not feel he was appropriate but said he would produce if Flanagan would do it.

References

External links

The Sound of One Hand Clapping at Oz Movies

1998 films
1998 drama films
Australian drama films
Films directed by Richard Flanagan
Films based on Australian novels
Films scored by Cezary Skubiszewski
Films set in Tasmania
Films shot in Tasmania
1990s English-language films
1990s Australian films